The 2021 World Military Sailing Championship was the 52nd edition of the World Military Sailing Championships. It was hosted by the Escuela Naval Militar and held in Marín, Pontevedra (Spain) June 6-12, 2021. 

The championship was the first competition organised by the International Military Sports Council after the COVID-19 pandemic. 

Boats used were in the Snipe international class. 

Niccolò Bertola and Sveva Carraro (Italy) won the championship. Second place was for Maksim Semerkhanov and Anzhelika Cherniakhovskaia (Russia), and third place for Andrii Husenko and Sofiia Naumenko (Ukraine).

Results

References

External links
Official Website

World Military Sailing Championship
World Military Sailing Championship
Sailing competitions in Spain
Sport in Galicia (Spain)